Cardo is a surname. Notable people with the name include:

 Dominic "The Doginator" Cardo, American competitive eater 
 Horacio Cardo (1944–2018), painter and illustrator from Argentina
 José Cardó Guarderas, Peruvian politician 
 Manolo Cardo (born 1940), Spanish football player 
 Michael Cardo (born 1977), South African politician
 Pierre Cardo (born 1949), French politician
 Ron Cardo (born 1946), American football player and coach

See also 
 Cardo (record producer)
 Cardo (disambiguation)

Surnames of French origin
Surnames of Spanish origin
Surnames of Portuguese origin